Shaalini Ente Koottukaari is a 1978 Indian Malayalam film, written by Padmarajan and directed by Mohan. The film is loosely based on a story of Padmarajan named "Parvathikutty". The film stars Shobha, Jalaja, Sukumaran and Venu Nagavalli in the lead roles. The film has musical score by G. Devarajan. The movie is about the friendship between two young girls named Shalini and Ammu. Shobha's suicide was during when the movie was running successfully in the box office. The film was remade in Tamil as Sujatha (1980).

Plot
The plot revolves around the life of Shalini (Shobha), a young college girl, who faces emotional isolation in many places of life. Much of the story is revealed through the memories of Ammu (Jalaja), Shalini's intimate friend both in college and in their village. Shalini and her brother Prabha (Venu Nagavally) experience a sort of emotional trauma and loneliness in their home, especially in the presence of their adamant father (K.P Ummer) and their stepmother (Sukumari). As Shalini is not satisfied with the barren life of her home, except in her attachment with her brother, she finds solace and comfort in the happiness provided by her college. As a young, smart and beautiful graduate student, she is attracted to many of the males of the campus, especially to Roy (Ravi Menon), one of the smartest boys of the college. But his love is rejected by Shalini, even though she felt a temporary fascination towards him. Later the suicide of her brother makes her life uneasy, as she experiences an emotional isolation. However, she overcomes the pain inflicted by the death. She returns to college with an aim to turn over a new leaf in her life. Here, she develops a love affair with a newly appointed, young and handsome lecturer Jayadevan (Sukumaran). In the shade of his love, Shalini gains confidence and feels aspirations towards life. But this unnatural relationship between a teacher and his student stirs up a little trouble in their college. Both of them ignore this as a wretched part of the social outlook. But their relation doesn't culminate in marriage, because Shalini falls ill with a brain tumor. This evaporates her confidence and finally she succumbs, leaving Jayadevan alone in the world and leaving everlasting memories in the mind of Ammu.

Cast
Shobha as Shalini
Jalaja as Ammu
Sukumaran as Jayadevan
Venu Nagavalli as Prabha
K. P. Ummer as Shalini's Father
Sukumari as Shantha
Vanitha Krishnachandran as Shalini's Stepsister
Ravi Menon as Roy
Sreenath as Unnikrishnan
Sathyakala

Soundtrack
The music was composed by G. Devarajan and the lyrics were written by M. D. Rajendran.

References

External links
 

1970s Malayalam-language films
1978 films
1978 romantic drama films
Films scored by G. Devarajan
Films directed by Mohan
Films with screenplays by Padmarajan
Malayalam films remade in other languages